Edward Newell may refer to:

Edward Theodore Newell (1886–1941), president of the American Numismatic Society
Edward Newell (cyclist), British Olympic cyclist
Edward John Newell (1771–1798), member of the Society of United Irishmen, turned informer and was assassinated